Ham Tran is a Vietnamese American film writer, editor, and director. He is of Hoa (Chinese Vietnamese) ancestry, specifically Teochew.

He earned an MFA in film directing from the UCLA Film School and is most famous for his thesis film The Anniversary, which was shortlisted for the Academy Award for Live Action Short Film.

His most recent effort is the feature film How to Fight in Six Inch Heels which had its U.S. premiere on 13 March 2014 at CAAMFest in San Francisco. Tran also directed the full-length Vietnamese boat people and re-education camp drama, Journey From the Fall, which was picked up in North America by ImaginAsian Pictures and released nationally on March 23, 2007.

In 2009, Tran received the Vilcek Prize for Creative Promise in Filmmaking.

Filmography

Director 
The Prescription (short film)
Pomegranate (short film)
2004 - The Anniversary
2006 - Journey From the Fall
2013 - How to Fight in Six Inch Heels
2014 - Hollow
2016 - Bitcoin Heist, Netflix
2017 - She's the Boss, Seattle International Film Festival
2022 - Maika: The Girl From Another Galaxy

Executive producer 
2007 - Owl and the Sparrow

Cinematographer and editor 
2007 - Oh, Saigon
2007 - The Rebel

References

External links 
 

UCLA Film School alumni
Vietnamese film directors
American film directors of Vietnamese descent
American film directors of Chinese descent
American people of Chinese descent
Living people
Year of birth missing (living people)